Florence is a town in Oneida County, New York, United States. The population was 1,025 at the 2010 census. The town is named after the city Florence in Italy.

The Town of Florence is in the northwestern corner of Oneida County and is northwest of the City of Rome.

History 

Florence was created from part of the Town of Camden in 1805.

Geography

The western town line is the border of Oswego County, and Oswego County and Lewis County form the northern town line.

Demographics

As of the census of 2000, there were 1,086 people, 369 households, and 285 families residing in the town.  The population density was 19.8 people per square mile (7.6/km2).  There were 432 housing units at an average density of 7.9 per square mile (3.0/km2).  The racial makeup of the town was 98.99% White, 0.28% African American, 0.28% Asian, and 0.46% from two or more races. Hispanic or Latino of any race were 0.37% of the population.

There were 369 households, out of which 43.1% had children under the age of 18 living with them, 62.6% were married couples living together, 8.9% had a female householder with no husband present, and 22.5% were non-families. 16.8% of all households were made up of individuals, and 6.2% had someone living alone who was 65 years of age or older.  The average household size was 2.94 and the average family size was 3.33.

In the town, the population was spread out, with 32.8% under the age of 18, 6.3% from 18 to 24, 31.7% from 25 to 44, 20.4% from 45 to 64, and 8.8% who were 65 years of age or older.  The median age was 35 years. For every 100 females, there were 107.3 males.  For every 100 females age 18 and over, there were 102.2 males.

The median income for a household in the town was $36,250, and the median income for a family was $39,000. Males had a median income of $26,146 versus $21,750 for females. The per capita income for the town was $13,571.  About 9.2% of families and 9.9% of the population were below the poverty line, including 10.1% of those under age 18 and 12.5% of those age 65 or over.

Communities and locations in Florence 
Corkin Hill – An elevation located southeast of Thompson Corners. Partially in the Town of Annsville.
Empeyville – A hamlet near the eastern town line.
Florence – The hamlet of Florence is in the northern part of the town.
Florence Hill – A hamlet southwest of Florence.
Forty-six Corners – A location north of Empeyville.
Hanifin Corners – A location north of Empeyville.
Thompson Corners – A location south of Empeyville.
Wickwire Hill – An elevation located west of Thompson Corners.

References

Utica–Rome metropolitan area
Towns in Oneida County, New York